This is a list of members of the South Australian House of Assembly from 1930 to 1933, as elected at the 1930 state election:

 Adelaide MHA Bert Edwards had his seat vacated for absence without leave on 23 June 1931. Lang Plan Campaign Committee candidate Martin Collaton won the resulting by-election on 25 July. He sat in parliament as a member of the new Lang Labor Party.
 The Labor Party split in August 1931 over the Cabinet's support for the Premiers' Plan. The state conference of the party expelled the 21 MHAs who had supported it in parliament: Lionel Hill, Bill Denny, Robert Richards, John McInnes, Sydney McHugh, Eric Shepherd, Frank Staniford, Frederick Birrell, Alfred Blackwell, Thomas Butterfield, Clement Collins, Jack Critchley, Even George, William Harvey, Leonard Hopkins, Robert Hunter, Beasley Kearney, Arthur McArthur, John Pedler, Albert Thompson, and Walter Warne. They appealed the decision, but by November most had accepted their expulsion and formed a separate party, the Parliamentary Labor Party; the remnants of the caucus continued to sit as official Labor.
 Sturt MHA Bob Dale was also expelled from the Labor Party in August 1931 for supporting the rival Lang Plan of New South Wales Premier Jack Lang. He subsequently sat as a member of the nascent Lang Labor Party.
 Victoria MHA Peter Reidy died on 17 January 1932. Liberal candidate Vernon Petherick won the resulting by-election on 5 March. 
 The Lang Labor Party split in April 1932, with MHA Martin Collaton and a number of senior officials forming the Lang Australian Labor Party. The party merged into the official Labor Party in October.
 The Liberal Federation merged with the SA branch of the Country Party to form the Liberal and Country League on 9 June 1932.
 Two expelled MHAs, Albert Thompson and Beasley Kearney, were reinstated to the official Labor Party in June 1932 after an appeal to the party's federal executive. A third MHA, Walter Warne, was also readmitted by the time of the 1933 election.

Members of South Australian parliaments by term
20th-century Australian politicians